"Voyage, voyage" is a song by French singer Desireless, released as the first single from her debut studio album, François (1989). It was written by Jean-Michel Rivat and Dominique Dubois, and produced by the former. Sung entirely in French, the song transcended the language barrier on the music charts and became a huge international success between 1986 and 1988, reaching the top position in more than ten countries across Europe.

Commercial performance
Since "Voyage, voyage" is sung exclusively in French, its chart success came as a surprise as it managed the rare feat of becoming a success in several nations usually closed to Francophone songs and artists, such as the United Kingdom and Ireland. In West Germany, the song topped the chart, and has the longest chart trajectory of 1987 in the top 20. It also reached number one in Austria, Norway, and Spain. The song missed the top spot in France, peaking at number two for four weeks, behind Elsa Lunghini's "T'en va pas".

The song initially reached number 53 on the UK Singles Chart in November 1987. After being remixed by Pete Hammond and Pete Waterman of PWL, the song was re-released in the United Kingdom in the spring of 1988, and climbed to number five in June of that year. The song's success continued in Ireland, where it reached number four twice, the original version in November 1987, followed by the PWL remix in June 1988.

Music video
The music video for "Voyage, voyage" was directed by Bettina Rheims, and premiered in France in December 1986.

Track listings
7-inch single
A. "Voyage, voyage" – 4:12
B. "Destin fragile" (instrumental) – 3:31

12-inch single
A. "Voyage, voyage" (extended remix) – 6:45
B. "Voyage, voyage" – 4:12

1988 UK 12-inch single and CD single (Britmix)
"Voyage voyage" (Britmix) – 7:06
"Voyage voyage" (Euro Remix Remix) – 6:12
"Destin fragile" (instrumental) – 3:31

Credits and personnel
Credits adapted from the liner notes of the 7-inch single of "Voyage, voyage".

Recording
Recorded at Studio D'Aguesseau, Boulogne-sur-Mer, France
Mixed at Studio Marcadet, Paris

Personnel

Desireless – vocals
Dominique Dubois – sampler
Jean-Michel Rivat – synthesiser, programming, production
Antoine Cambourakis – recording
Gilbert Courtois – recording
Dominique Blanc-Francard – mixing
Daniel Glikmans – backing vocals
Claudie Fritsch-Mentrop – backing vocals

Charts

Weekly charts

1 Remix

Year-end charts

Certifications and sales

Wink version

Released on 24 February 1993 by Polystar Records, it was their 17th single, with Japanese lyrics written by Neko Oikawa.

The single peaked at No. 19 on Oricon's singles chart and sold over 69,000 copies.

Track listing

Weekly charts

Kate Ryan version

Belgian singer Kate Ryan covered the song for her fourth studio album Free (2008). Slightly retitled "Voyage Voyage", her version as the album's lead single in 2007, featuring "We All Belong" on its B-side, which is the anthem of the event EuroGames 2007 that took place in Antwerp, Belgium, in 2007.

It was Ryan's first single released under ARS Entertainment, following her departure from EMI Belgium. Commercially, "Voyage Voyage" reached number two in Belgium, as well as the top 10 in Finland, the Netherlands and Spain.

Track listing
CD single
"Voyage Voyage"
"Voyage Voyage" (Extended Version)
"We All Belong"
"We All Belong" (Extended Version)

Charts

Year-end charts

Certifications and sales

Other covers
"Voyage, voyage" was also covered by the Mexican band Magneto in 1991, with a version in Spanish titled "Vuela Vuela" (English: Fly, fly). Mikel Herzog was credited with the translation. This version peaked at number three on Billboards Hot Latin Songs chart. The gothic metal band Sirenia released their cover of "Voyage, voyage" on 10 February 2021 as a single and music video to their album Riddles, Ruins & Revelations which also is included as a bonus track on the album.

See also
List of number-one hits of 1987 (Germany)
List of number-one singles of 1987 (Spain)
VG-lista 1964 to 1994

References

External links
Desireless version

Wink version

Kate Ryan version

1986 debut singles
1986 songs
1993 singles
2007 singles
CBS Records singles
Desireless songs
Wink (duo) songs
Kate Ryan songs
French-language songs
Japanese-language songs
Songs with lyrics by Neko Oikawa
Number-one singles in Austria
Number-one singles in Germany
Number-one singles in Norway
Number-one singles in Spain